Jamal Cain (born March 20, 1999) is an American professional basketball player for the Miami Heat of the National Basketball Association (NBA), on a two-way contract with the Sioux Falls Skyforce of the NBA G League. He previously played in college for the Marquette Golden Eagles and the Oakland Golden Grizzlies.

High school career 
Cain attended the Academy for Business and Technology in Melvindale, Michigan before transferring to Cornerston Health and Technology in Detroit, Michigan. As a senior, Cain was rated as the second best player in Michigan by the Detroit Free Press. He was named a finalist for the Mr. Basketball of Michigan. Cain was a top rated recruit and he committed to Marquette University.

College career 
Cain attended Marquette University for his first four years. He averaged 9.6 points and 6.3 rebounds per game as a senior. For his final season of eligibility, Cain transferred to Oakland University and played for Greg Kampe and the Oakland Golden Grizzlies as a graduate transfer. He averaged 19.9 points, 10.2 rebounds, and 1.83 steals per game while shooting 49.9 percent from the floor and 84.1 percent from the foul line. He was named the Horizon League Co-Player of the Year.

Professional career

Miami Heat (2022–present)
After going undrafted in the 2022 NBA Draft, Cain signed a summer league contract with the Miami Heat. He signed a deal with the Heat on July 15. On October 9, 2022, Cain's contract was converted into a two-way, allowing him to play with the Heat and its NBA G League affiliate, Sioux Falls Skyforce. On November 12, 2022, Cain made his NBA debut in a 132-115 win over the Charlotte Hornets.

References

External links
Oakland Golden Grizzlies bio
Marquette Golden Eagles bio

1999 births
Living people
American men's basketball players
Basketball players from Michigan
Marquette Golden Eagles men's basketball players
Miami Heat players
Oakland Golden Grizzlies men's basketball players
Sioux Falls Skyforce players
Small forwards
Sportspeople from Pontiac, Michigan
Undrafted National Basketball Association players